180,000 species of Lepidoptera are described, equivalent to 10% of the total described species of living organisms. This is a list of the diversity of the Lepidoptera showing the estimated number of genera and species described for each superfamily and, where available, family. See Lepidoptera for a note of the schedule of families used.

References

Kristensen, N.P. (Ed.). 1999. Lepidoptera, Moths and Butterflies. Volume 1: Evolution, Systematics, and Biogeography. Handbuch der Zoologie. Eine Naturgeschichte der Stämme des Tierreiches / Handbook of Zoology. A Natural History of the phyla of the Animal Kingdom. Band / Volume IV Arthropoda: Insecta Teilband / Part 35: 491 pp. Walter de Gruyter, Berlin, New York. 

Lepidopterology